Serhiy Volodymyrovych Barilko (born 5 January 1987) is a professional Ukrainian football midfielder.

Career
Barilko was the product of the Metalist Youth School system. Myron Markevych promoted Barilko to the senior team at the end of the 2006–07 season. However, Barilko continues to play for the Metalist Reserves as well.

Personal life
His brother Volodymyr Barilko is also a professional footballer.

External links 

Official Website Profile
Profile on EUFO
Profile on FootballSquads

1987 births
Living people
Ukrainian footballers
Ukrainian Premier League players
FC Metalist Kharkiv players
FC Obolon-Brovar Kyiv players
FC Solli Plyus Kharkiv players
Association football midfielders
Footballers from Kharkiv